Soumya Raychaudhuri is a Professor of Medicine and Biomedical Informatics at Harvard Medical School, and an Institute Member at Broad Institute. He is the JS Coblyn and MB Brenner Distinguished Chair in Rheumatology/Immunology and a practicing rheumatologist at Brigham and Women's Hospital. He is the Director for the Center for Data Sciences at Brigham and Harvard. In addition, he serves as a Visiting Professor in Genetics at the University of Manchester. His research focuses on human genetics and computational genomics to understand immune-mediated diseases.

Education and Career 
Raychaudhuri completed his undergraduate degrees in biophysics and mathematics from State University of New York at Buffalo in 1997.  He went on to join the Stanford University Medical School where he completed his M.D. and Ph.D. degrees. He pursued clinical training in internal medicine, followed by subspecialty training in rheumatology at BWH. He concurrently completed postdoctoral training in human genetics at the Broad Institute with Mark Daly. In 2010, he launched his laboratory and joined the faculty at Harvard Medical School. He was promoted to Professor in 2018.

His lab at Harvard uses human genetics, functional genomics and bioinformatics techniques to study immune mediated diseases, such as rheumatoid arthritis and tuberculosis. His lab has also been active in investigating the genetic basis of other diseases including age related macular degeneration and type I diabetes.

Awards & memberships 
 Doris Duke Award 
 American College of Rheumatology Henry Kunkel Young Investigator Award
 Elected member of American Society of Clinical Investigation

References 

Harvard Medical School faculty
Physicians of Brigham and Women's Hospital
American rheumatologists
Bengali people
Living people
1975 births